NGC 235 is a lenticular galaxy in the constellation of Cetus. Its companion, PGC 2570, appears in the line of sight of NGC 235, but has no relation with NGC 235. This pair was first discovered by Francis Leavenworth in 1886. Dreyer, the compiler of the catalogue, described the galaxy as "extremely faint, small, round, brighter middle and nucleus".

References

External links
 

Lenticular galaxies
?
0235
Cetus (constellation)